PMS1 protein homolog 1 is a protein that in humans is encoded by the PMS1 gene.

Function 

The protein encoded by this gene was identified by its homology to a yeast protein involved in DNA mismatch repair. A role for this protein in mismatch repair has not been proven. However, the protein forms heterodimers with MLH1, a DNA mismatch repair protein, and some cases of hereditary nonpolyposis colorectal cancer have been found to have mutations in this gene.

References

Further reading